Sarıhacallı (also, Sarı Hacılı, Sargadzhyly, Sari-Gadzhili, and Sarygadzhally) is a village in the Qabala Rayon of Azerbaijan.  The village forms part of the municipality of Dizaxlı.

References 

Populated places in Qabala District